Shirndré-Lee Edoline Simmons (birth 3 July 2000) is a South African field hockey player for the South African national team.

Personal life
She attended St. Michael's School, in Bloemfontein and are is graduated from University of the Free State is Bachelor of Business Administration is 2022.

Career

Under–21
Simmons made her debut for the South Africa U–21 team in 2016, at the Junior Africa Cup in Windhoek. After gaining qualification to the FIH Junior World Cup, she went on to represent the team at the tournament in Santiago.

National team
Simmons participated at the Hockey Africa Cup of Nations and  the  2022 Women's FIH Hockey World Cup. Shortly after this announcement, she was also named in the squad for the Commonwealth Games in Birmingham.

References

External links

2000 births
Living people
South African female field hockey players
University of the Free State alumni